The renal fascia is a dense, elastic connective tissue envelope enclosing the kidney and adrenal gland, together with the layer of perirenal fat surrounding these two.

The renal fascia separates the adipose capsule of kidney from the overlying pararenal fat. The deeper layers deep to the renal fascia are, in order, the adipose capsule (or perirenal fat), the renal capsule and finally the parenchyma of the renal cortex. At the renal hilum, the renal fascia extends into the renal sinus.

The renal fascia was originally described as consisting of two distinct structures: the anterior renal fascia (Gerota's fascia), and posterior renal fascia (Zuckerkandl's fascia); these two fasciae were said to fuse laterally to form the lateroconal fascia. Understanding of the structure of the renal fascia has subsequently evolved.

Additional images

References

External links 
  - "Posterior Abdominal Wall: The Retroperitoneal Fat and Suprarenal Glands"
 
 

Kidney anatomy
Fascia